Jinyuan Township (Mandarin: 金源藏族乡) is a township in Hualong Hui Autonomous County, Haidong, Qinghai, China. In 2010, Jinyuan Township had a total population of 6,551: 3,364 males and 3,187 females: 1,810 aged under 14, 4,343 aged between 15 and 65 and 398 aged over 65.

References 

Township-level divisions of Qinghai
Haidong
Ethnic townships of the People's Republic of China